The Homebush Street Circuit, also known as the Sydney Olympic Park Street Circuit, was a  temporary street circuit around the former Olympic precinct at Sydney Olympic Park, Homebush Bay, Australia. The track hosted the Sydney 500 and was used for the first time at the final round of the 2009 V8 Supercar Championship Series. The circuit was used for the final time in December 2016 due to a relocation to a Newcastle after it was announced the ANZ stadium precinct would be upgraded and block the track location.

Layout

The circuit was designed by Mark Skaife, who focused on creating a track with a variety of bumps, camber changes and fast and slow corners making it difficult to complete the perfect lap. It was constructed on Australia Avenue, Kevin Coombs Avenue, Edwin Flack Avenue and Dawn Fraser Avenue. 140 mature trees needed to be removed and kilometres of tarmac needed to be torn up to accommodate the race. Overall the track had a mixture of track surfaces.

V8 Supercar driver Jason Richards suggested that there were many difficult braking areas, interesting corners and good passing spots. The main straight was the single widest section of race track in Australia, while the straight along Edwin Flack Avenue was one of the narrowest. The outside of turn eight had an unusual negative camber that caught many drivers out in the inaugural race, resulting in several cars crashing into the outer barriers.

The first race was won by the Holden Racing Team's Garth Tander from pole position while, the second 250 km race was won by Dick Johnson Racing's James Courtney (who started from second position on the grid). Jamie Whincup secured winning the 2009 V8 Supercar Championship Series after finishing fifth in race 1 and fourteenth in race 2.

Environmental concerns

The conversion of part of the Sydney Olympic Park precinct into a V8 street-car race circuit was widely criticised. The Total Environment Centre said that the New South Wales Government overrode the threatened species law, as well as the Homebush Bay Authority's planning principals, and would cause social, environmental and economic disruption at Sydney Olympic Park. Tony McCormick, who led the team that designed Sydney Olympic Park, said "I find it truly a travesty... The site was supposed to be a legacy for generations and we can’t even make it last a decade."

Closure
In 2015, V8 Supercars proposed to shorten the circuit to reduce the event's costs. This proposal failed, and in March 2016 it was announced that the ongoing costs of running the event would result in 2016 being the final running of the Sydney 500.

Lap records
As of 4 December 2016, the official race lap records at Homebush Street Circuit are listed as:

See also
Sochi Autodrom – a Formula One circuit built around the site of the 2014 Winter Olympics in Sochi, Russia.
Beijing Olympic Green Circuit – a Formula E circuit built around the site of the 2008 Summer Olympics in Beijing, China.

References

External links
Official Website of Sydney 500

Motorsport venues in New South Wales
Former Supercars Championship circuits
Sports venues in Sydney
2009 establishments in Australia
2016 disestablishments in Australia
Defunct motorsport venues in Australia